List of FELDA/FELCRA Federal Roads in Malaysia

Peninsula Malaysia

Sabah

Malaysian Federal Roads
FELDA/FELCRA Federal